Quirin Moll (born 21 January 1991) is a German professional footballer who plays as a defensive midfielder for  club 1860 Munich.

Career
Moll played youth football for Bayern Munich and SpVgg Greuther Fürth before joining SV Heimstetten of the Bayernliga in 2010. Two years later he signed for SpVgg Unterhaching and made his 3. Liga debut as a substitute for Yasin Yılmaz in a 4–1 win over 1. FC Heidenheim. He signed for Dynamo Dresden in July 2014.

In April 2016, it was announced that Moll would join Eintracht Braunschweig on a free transfer for the 2015–16 season.

Moll joined 1860 Munich on 20 June 2018. He signed a contract extension with the club in June 2021.

Honours
Dynamo Dresden
 3. Liga: 2015–16

References

External links
 
 

1991 births
Living people
People from Dachau
Sportspeople from Upper Bavaria
German footballers
Footballers from Bavaria
2. Bundesliga players
3. Liga players
SpVgg Unterhaching players
Dynamo Dresden players
Eintracht Braunschweig players
TSV 1860 Munich players
Association football midfielders
SV Heimstetten players